The 1987 African Women's Handball Championship was the seventh edition of the African Women's Handball Championship, held in Morocco. It acted as the African qualifying tournament for the 1988 Summer Olympics.

Final ranking

External links
Results on todor66.com

1987 Women
African Women's Handball Championship
African Women's Handball Championship
1987 in Moroccan sport
1987 in African handball
Women's handball in Morocco
1987 in African women's sport